This is a list of diplomatic missions in Bolivia.  At present, the capital city of La Paz hosts 31 embassies.  Several other countries have ambassadors accredited from other regional capitals.  This listing excludes honorary consulates.

Embassies in La Paz

Other missions in La Paz
 (Development office)
 (Program office)
 (Delegation)

Gallery of embassies

Consular missions

La Paz 
 (Consulate General)

Cobija 
 (Consulate General)

Cochabamba 
 (Consulate)
 (Consulate General)
 (Consulate General)

El Alto 
 (Consulate)

Guayaramerin 
 (Consulate)

Puerto Suárez 
 (Consulate)

Santa Cruz de la Sierra 
 (Consulate General)
 (Consulate General)
 (Consulate General)

 (Consular office)

 (Consulate General)
 (Consulate General)
 (Consulate General)

Tarija 
 (Consulate General)

Villamontes 
 (Consulate)

Villazón 
 (Consulate)

Yacuiba 
 (Consulate)

Accredited embassies
Resident in Brasilia, Brazil:

 
 

 
 
 

 
 
 

Resident in Buenos Aires, Argentina:

 
 
 
 

Resident in Caracas, Venezuela:

 
 
 
 
 
 

Resident in Lima, Peru:

 
 
 
 

 
 
  
 
 
  
 
 
  

Resident elsewhere:

 (Washington, D.C.)
 (Santiago)
 (Bogotá)
 (Santiago)
 (Bogotá)
 (Santiago)

Former Embassies 
  (closed in 2006)
 
 
  (closed in 2009)
  (closed in 2013) 
  (closed in 2000)

See also
 Foreign relations of Bolivia
 List of diplomatic missions of Bolivia

References

Bolivian Ministry of Foreign Affairs

List
Bolivia
Diplomatic missions